The Alpine Fault is a geological fault that runs almost the entire length of New Zealand's South Island (c. 480 km) and forms the boundary between the Pacific Plate and the Indo-Australian Plate. The Southern Alps have been uplifted on the fault over the last 12 million years in a series of earthquakes. However, most of the motion on the fault is strike-slip (side to side), with the Tasman district and West Coast moving North and Canterbury and Otago moving South. The average slip rates in the fault's central region are about 38 mm a year, very fast by global standards. The last major earthquake on the Alpine Fault was in c. 1717 AD, and the probability of another one occurring within the next 50 years is estimated at about 75 percent.

Geographic extent and plate motion 
 
The Pacific Plate and Indo-Australian Plate boundary forms the Macquarie Fault Zone in the Puysegur Trench off the southwestern corner of the South Island and comes onshore as the Alpine Fault just north of Milford Sound. The Alpine Fault then runs the length of the South Island just west of the Southern Alps to near Lewis Pass in the central northern section of the island. At this point, it splits into a set of smaller faults known as the Marlborough Fault System. This set of faults, which includes the Wairau Fault, the Hope Fault, the Awatere Fault, and the Clarence Fault, transfer displacement between the Alpine Fault and the Hikurangi subduction zone to the north. The Hope Fault is thought to represent the primary continuation of the Alpine Fault.

The Indo-Australian Plate is subducting towards the east south of the South Island and the Pacific Plate is subducting towards the West to the north. In the middle, the Alpine Fault is a transform boundary and has both dextral (right-lateral) strike-slip movement and uplift on the southeastern side. The uplift is due to an element of convergence between the plates, meaning that the fault has a significant high-angle reverse oblique component to its displacement.

The Alpine Fault has the greatest uplift near Aoraki / Mount Cook in its central section. Here the relative motion between the two plates averages 37–40 mm a year. This is distributed as 36–39 mm of horizontal and 6–10 mm upwards movement on the fault's plane per year.

Geological origin and evolution 

 
Between 25 and 12 million years ago the movement on the proto-Alpine Fault was exclusively strike-slip. The Southern Alps had not yet formed and most of New Zealand was covered in water. Then uplift slowly began as the plate motion became slightly oblique to the strike of the Alpine Fault. In the last 12 million years, the Southern Alps have been uplifted approximately 20 kilometres, however, as this has occurred more rain has been trapped by the mountains leading to more erosion. This, along with isostatic constraints, has kept the Southern Alps less than 4,000 m.

Uplift on the Alpine Fault has led to the exposure of deep metamorphic rocks near the fault within the Southern Alps. This includes mylonites and the Alpine Schist, which increases in metamorphic grade towards the fault. The eroded material has formed the Canterbury Plains. The Alpine Fault is not a single structure but often splits into pure strike-slip and dip-slip components. Near the surface, the fault can have multiple rupture zones.

Fault zone geology 
The fault zone is exposed at numerous locations along the West Coast, and typically consists of a 10–50 m wide fault gouge zone with pervasive hydrothermal alteration. Most of the movement along the fault occurs in this zone. In outcrop, the fault zone is overlain by mylonites which formed at depth and have been uplifted by the fault.

Earthquakes 

There have been no major historical earthquakes on the Alpine Fault. Because of this, during the mid-20th century it was speculated that the Alpine Fault creeps without making large earthquakes. However, it is now inferred by multiples lines of evidence that the Alpine Fault ruptures, creating major earthquakes approximately every few hundred years.

Prehistoric 
The Māori arrived in New Zealand c.1300 but never reached a high population density in the colder South Island. Therefore, while earthquakes are an important part of Māori oral tradition, no stories have been passed down about South Island earthquakes. Over the last thousand years, there have been four major ruptures along the Alpine Fault, causing earthquakes of about magnitude 8. These had previously been determined to have occurred in approximately 1100, 1430, 1620 and 1717 CE, at intervals between 100 and 350 years. Scientists say that a similar earthquake could happen at any time, as the interval since 1717 is longer than the intervals between the earlier events. Newer research carried out by the University of Otago and the Australian Nuclear Science and Technology Organisation revised the dates of the pre-1717 earthquakes to between 1535 and 1596 (instead of 1620), 1374 and 1405 (instead of 1430), and 1064 and 1120 (instead of 1100). An earlier earthquake was identified to have occurred between 887 and 965.

Historic 
There have been no major earthquakes on the Alpine Fault in historic times; its southern and northern offshoots have, however, experienced sizable earthquakes:

1929 – Arthur's Pass, estimated magnitude = 7.1
1929 – Murchison, estimated magnitude = 7.8
1968 – Inangahua, estimated magnitude = 7.1
 2003 – Fiordland, estimated magnitude = 7.1
2009 – Fiordland, estimated magnitude = 7.8

Prediction of next earthquake 
In 2012, GNS Science researchers published an 8000-year timeline of 24 major earthquakes on the (southern end of the) fault from sediments at Hokuri Creek, near Lake McKerrow in north Fiordland. In 2017, GNS researchers revised the figures after they combined updated Hokuri site records with a thousand-year record from another site, 20 km away at John O'Groats River, to produce a record of 27 major earthquake events during the 8000-year period. This gave a mean recurrence rate of 291 years, plus or minus 23 years, versus the previously estimated rate of 329 years, plus or minus 26 years. In the new study, the interval between earthquakes ranged from 160 to 350 years, and the probability of an earthquake occurring in the 50 years following 2017 was estimated at 29 percent.

Projected effects of a rupture 
Large ruptures can also trigger earthquakes on the faults continuing north from the Alpine Fault.  There is paleotsunami evidence of near-simultaneous ruptures of the Alpine Fault and Wellington (and/or other major) faults to the north having occurred at least twice in the past 1,000 years. A 2018 study says that a significant rupture in the Alpine Fault could lead to roads (particularly in or to the West Coast) being blocked for months, as with the 2016 Kaikoura earthquake, with problems in supplying towns and evacuating tourists. District councils along the West Coast and in Canterbury have commissioned studies and begun preparations for an anticipated large earthquake on the Alpine Fault.

History of research 
In 1940, Harold Wellman found that the Southern Alps were associated with a fault line approximately 650 km (400 miles) long. The fault was officially named the Alpine Fault in 1942 as an extension of a previously mapped structure. At the same time, Harold Wellman proposed the  lateral displacement on the Alpine Fault. This displacement was inferred by Wellman due in part to the similarity of rocks in Southland and Nelson on either side of the Alpine Fault. Lateral displacements of this magnitude could not be explained by pre-plate tectonics geology and his ideas were not initially widely accepted until 1956. Wellman also proposed in 1964 that the Alpine Fault was a Cenozoic structure, which was in conflict with the older Mesozoic age accepted at the time. This idea coupled with the displacement on the fault proposed that the earth's surface was in relatively rapid constant movement and helped to overthrow the old geosynclinal hypothesis in favour of plate tectonics.

Richard Norris and Alan Cooper from the Department of Geology, University of Otago conducted extensive research on the structure and petrology of the Alpine Fault respectively throughout the later 20th and early 21st centuries. It was during this time that the cyclicity of the Alpine Fault earthquakes and meaning of the increase in metamorphic grade towards the fault was discovered and refined. Originally this regional increase in grade was inferred to be from frictional heating along the fault not uplift of deeper geological sequences. Richard H. Sibson from the same university also used the Alpine Fault to refine his nomenclature of fault rocks which gained international adherence.

Deep Fault Drilling Project 

The Deep Fault Drilling Project (DFDP) was an attempt in 2014 to retrieve rock and fluid samples and make geophysical measurements inside the Alpine Fault zone at depth. It was a $2.5 million international research project designed to drill 1.3 km to the fault plan in two months. The DFDP was the second project to try to drill an active fault zone and return samples after the San Andreas Fault Observatory at Depth. One of the goals of the project was to use the deformed rocks from the fault zone to determine its resistance to stress. Researchers also planned to install long term equipment for measuring pressure, temperature and seismic activity near the fault zone. It was led by New Zealand geologists Rupert Sutherland, John Townsend and Virginia Toy and involves an international team from New Zealand, Canada, France, Germany, Japan, the United Kingdom, and the United States.

In 2017, they reported they had discovered beneath Whataroa, a small township on the Alpine Fault, "extreme" hydrothermal activity which "could be commercially very significant". One of the lead researchers said that it is likely to be globally unique.

See also
Geology of New Zealand
List of earthquakes in New Zealand
San Andreas Fault

References

Sources

 
 Wells, A.; Yetton, M.T.; Duncan, R.P.; and Stewart, G.H. (1999). Prehistoric dates of the most recent Alpine fault earthquakes, New Zealand. Geology, 27(11), 995–998. (abstract)

Further reading

External links
 Alpine Fault earthquake talk  – Otago Regional Council
 Alpine Fault research in the Department of Geology – University of Otago
 Where were New Zealand’s largest earthquakes? – GNS Science
 Earthquakes and Tectonics in New Zealand – Nature & Company Limited
 The Next Alpine Fault Earthquake in New Zealand – GNS Science on YouTube
 Deep Fault Drilling Programme

Active faults
Seismic faults of New Zealand
Strike-slip faults
Geographic areas of seismological interest